Khumār Barabankvi (15 September 1919 – 19 February 1999) was the pen name of a Urdu poet and lyricist from Barabanki, Uttar Pradesh, India. His real name was Mohammed Haidar Khan.  

The word comes from the Arabic root 'Khum' which means a jar of wine. His ghazals are sung by many famous singers such as Mehdi Hassan, Ghulam Ali, K. L. Saigal, Mohammed Rafi, Lata Mangeshkar, Jagjit Singh and many other singers.

Early life
Khumar Barabankvi's real name was Mohammed Haidar Khan, but he wrote under the takhallus (pen name/ nom de plume) of Khumār, which means intoxication. The word comes from the Arabic root 'Khum' which means a jar of wine. He was born on 15 September 1919 in Barabanki, Uttar Pradesh. He found poetic environment in his family during his childhood. His father, Dr. Ghulam Haider, wrote salaams and marsiyas under pen name ‘Bahar’. His uncle ‘Qaraar Barabnkvi’ was a well-known poet of Barabanki who guided Khumar in young age and did Islah (corrections) to his poetry. His brother Kazim Haider ‘Nigar’, who died in early age, was also a poet. Khumar completed his high school from Government College, Barabanki. He then moved to Lucknow for his Intermediate classes where a romantic turn in his life made him quit education and start writing love poetry.
 
Khumar Barabankvi had a melodious voice and soon became popular in Mushairas (poetry reading live events). He also got acquainted with the poet Jigar Moradabadi and remained in association with him for a long period. His ghazals and voice made him a favorite in Mushairas. Jigar Muradabadi and Khumar Barabankvi were known to guarantee for the success of any mushaira with their poetry as well as their melodious voice and style of recitation. Khumar was an ardent supporter of classical ghazal like Jigar Moradabadi.

Khumar has written some famous songs for Hindi films like Shahjehan (1946 film), Baradari (1955 film), 'Saaz aur Awaaz', Love And God (1986) directed by K. Asif etc. He worked closely with noted composers like Naushad and Nashad among others. He wrote all the songs for the film 'Saaz Aur Awaaz' produced by Naushad in 1966 and wrote some songs again for the film Love and God (1986 film) for which Naushad again composed music.

Death
Khumār Barabankvi died on 19 February 1999.

Published work
He got his work published as: 
 ‘Hadees-e-Deegaraan’ 
 ‘Aatish-e-Tar’ 
 'Raqs-e-Mai’
 " Shab-e- Tab" 
 Aahang e Khumar (1995)

See also
 Ghazal
 Suroor Barabankvi

References.

External links
 Poems of Khumar Barabankvi
 -Urdu shayari of Khumar on rekhta.org website
 Khumar Barabankvi on IMDb website
 

Urdu-language poets
Indian lyricists
20th-century Indian Muslims
People from Barabanki, Uttar Pradesh
1919 births
1999 deaths
20th-century poets